Bodhan town in Nizamabad district of the Indian state Telangana. Bodhan is primarily known for the Nizam Sugar Factory founded by a Nizam of Hyderabad, and some historical places such as The Jalal Bukhari Dargah at Ranjalbase, The Chakreshwara Shiva Temple, The Renuka Temple, Bheemuni Gutta at Rakasipet and prominent other historical places, such as the Pandu Teertha (Pandu Lake dug by the Pandavas), Chakra Teertha (Chakki lake) and many other temples and shrines.

History 

Bodhan is identified as the ancient Podana town (Podanapura), which was known to be the capital of Asmaka Mahajanapada of ancient India that covered present-day Andhra Pradesh, Telangana, and Maharashtra. It probably was also served as the capital of Vinayaditya, an 8th century ruler of the Vemulavada Chalukya dynasty.

Rakasipet is a part of the Bodhan town which has historical significance. It is considered that "Pandavas"  while doing "Aranyavas" stayed near Bodhan. Bhima killed "Bakasura" near Rakasipet (Bodhan).That place is called Bhimuni Gutta.

Bodhan is believed to be the birthplace of the dynasty's Kannada-language court poet Pampa. The samadhi (burial place) of Pampa is also believed to be located at Bodhan: it was discovered in the 1970s, when historian Yadagiri Rao deciphered a form of the old Kannada script. The samadhi is of an unidentified saint, who is believed to be Pampa.

Asia's second largest sugar factory is in Bodhan.

Demographics 
 India census, Bodhan had a population of 77,573. Males constitute 50% of the population and females 50%. Bodhan has an average literacy rate of 66%, lower than the national average of 74.04%; with male literacy of 71% and female literacy of 61%. 11% of the population is under 6 years of age.

Revenue Division 
Bodhan is one of the 68 revenue divisions of Telangana state. It consists of ten mandals namely Bodhan, Varni, Chandur, Mosra, Rudrur, Kotagiri, Renjal,saloora,pothangal and Yedapally. The entire division comes under ayacut of Nizamsagar Project

Government and politics 

Civic administration

Bodhan Municipality was constituted in 1952 and is classified as a second grade municipality with 38 election wards.

Bodhan Assembly
In 2014, Shakil of TRS won the seat by a margin of 15,884 (10.37%). Shakil secured 44.02% of the total votes polled.

In the 2014 assembly elections, TRS led in the Bodhan Assembly segment of the Nizamabad Parliamentary/Lok Sabha constituency

In 2018, assembly elections Mr Shakil Aamir Mohammed won Second time Ruling for bodhan constitution as a Member of legislature assembly with majority(74895) Votes, 47.14% With TRS (Telengana Rastra Samity ) political Party, Which was founded at 27 April 2001 by K Chandra Shekar Rao Chief minister of Telangana,

References 

Cities and towns in Nizamabad district